Odd Box Records was a British DIY indiepop record label started in London but was finally based in Cardiff, Wales, following relocation in 2016. It was hailed as a "big presence on the indiepop scene."

History
Odd Box was launched in 2009, after the dissolution of earlier imprint Lost Music Records. The label has issued a steady and wide-ranging series of albums, EPs and singles since that time including well-received releases by The Wolfhounds, Pocketbooks, Sarandon, The Manhattan Love Suicides, Martha, Joanna Gruesome, The Blanche Hudson Weekend and The Ethical Debating Society, as well as other groups such as The Millipedes, 
The Humms, The Wednesday Club, One Happy Island, The Monorals, The Smittens, Ace Bushy Striptease, Pale Man Made, Tyrannosaurus Dead, Wolf Girl and Giant Burger.
 
In 2017 Odd Box released the first in a planned series of EPs by The Darling Buds, featuring their first new material for 25 years, and reissued the debut album by Witching Waves, originally released on Soft Power Records. The label ended in 2019.

Odd Box album artists
Ace Bushy Striptease
Anguish Sandwich
The Blanche Hudson Weekend
City Yelps
 Corporationpop
The Ethical Debating Society
Frozy
Giant Burger
The Humms 
The Manhattan Love Suicides
The Millipedes
Nervous Twitch
One Happy Island
Pale Man Made
Pocketbooks
Rainbow Reservoir
The Rosie Taylor Project
Sarandon
Silent Forum
The Smittens
Suggested Friends
T.O.Y.S.
T-Shirt Weather
Two White Cranes
Tyrannosaurus Dead
The Wednesday Club
The Wendy Darlings
Witching Waves 
Wolf Girl
The Wolfhounds
Year Of Birds

References

External links
Odd Box bandcamp
45cat
Discogs
Odd Box label review, 2011
Odd Box interview, 2015

British independent record labels
Record labels established in 2009
Indie pop record labels
Alternative rock record labels
Indie rock record labels